Better Days Ahead is the third studio album of jazz guitarist Norman Brown released in 1996 on Motown Records. The album reached No. 2 on the Billboard Top Jazz Albums chart.

Overview
Earth, Wind & Fire Horns appear on the album.

Track listing

References

 

1996 albums
Norman Brown (guitarist) albums
Motown albums